Chloroselas vansomereni, the Van Someren's gem, is a butterfly in the family Lycaenidae. It is found in Kenya (the Tana River).

References

Butterflies described in 1966
Chloroselas
Endemic insects of Kenya
Butterflies of Africa